The Nextwave Sessions is an extended play by British indie rock band Bloc Party. It was released on 12 August 2013 in the United Kingdom, and 13 August in the United States, via Frenchkiss Records. "Ratchet" and "Obscene" were recorded with Dan Carey, who had previously worked with Bat for Lashes and Hot Chip. It features five previously unreleased songs that were given live debuts on the band's 2013 North American tour. This is the final Bloc Party release to feature founding members Matt Tong and Gordon Moakes who left the band in 2013 and 2015 respectively.

"Ratchet", the EP's lead track, was given its first radio play by Zane Lowe on BBC Radio 1 on 25 June. An accompanying video, created by Cyriak using heavily edited footage from the music videos for "Octopus", "Hunting for Witches", "Little Thoughts" and "Helicopter", was released on the band's Vevo channel on the same day.

Track listing

References

Bloc Party EPs
2013 EPs
Frenchkiss Records EPs
Albums produced by Dan Carey (record producer)